Soldiers Annex Lake is located  southeast of Flagstaff in the state of Arizona. Long Lake is the main lake of the area. The facilities are maintained by Coconino National Forest division of the USDA Forest Service.

Fish species
 Largemouth Bass
 Bluegill
 Channel Catfish
 Northern Pike
 Walleye
 Golden Shiner
 Crayfish

References

External links
 Arizona Fishing Locations Map
 Arizona Boating Locations Facilities Map
 Video of Soldiers Annex Lake
 

Reservoirs in Coconino County, Arizona
Coconino National Forest
Reservoirs in Arizona